(John) Leonard Scollay (8 May 1973 – 25 March 2014) was a fiddle player from the Shetland Islands.

Musical career
Scollay was a founding member of Shetland bands Bongshang and Rock Salt & Nails, was a former Shetland Young Fiddler of the Year and a BBC Young Tradition Award finalist. He was described by BBC Radio Scotland DJ Tom Morton as "one of the best fiddle players I've ever heard".

Accidental death
Scollay died in a fishing accident in the early hours of Tuesday 25 March 2014 when the fishing boat he was crewing hit rocks and sank off Shetland.

References 

1973 births
2014 deaths
Shetland fiddlers
20th-century Scottish male musicians
21st-century Scottish male musicians
Deaths by drowning in the United Kingdom